The Historians'      History of the World, subtitled A Comprehensive Narrative of the Rise and Development  as Recorded by over two thousand of the Great Writers of all Ages, is a 25-volume encyclopedia of world history originally published in English near the beginning of the 20th century. It was compiled by Henry Smith Williams, a medical doctor and author of many books on medicine, science, and history, as well as other authorities on history, and published in New York in 1902 by Encyclopædia Britannica and the Outlook Company. It was also published in London printed by Morrison & Gibb Limited, of Edinburgh. A second edition was published in 1907 in London by The Times. Two further volumes were subsequently released in the 5th edition of 1926, titled "These eventful years" and dealing with the First World War, published by Encyclopaedia Britannica. 

Others involved were historian Walter Lynwood Fleming, and Rupert Hughes as editor.

Digital reproductions of the volumes are available via the Google Books project (links below).  Most have been converted to the DjVu file format and made available on archive.org.

List of volumes

Volume I: Prolegomena, Egypt, Mesopotamia 
Google Books link to Volume I

The prolegomena discuss various topics relating to the practice of historical study.

Volume II: Israel, India, Persia, Phoenicia, minor nations of Western Asia 
Google Books link to Volume II

Part IV: The History of Israel is based chiefly upon the following authorities, as stated in the front matter: Ernest Babelon, The Holy Bible, T.K. Cheyne, Maximilian Wolfgang Duncker, G.H.A. Ewald, Edward Gibbon, F. Hitzig, J. Jahn, Josephus, Rudolf Kittel, Max Löhr, L. Ménard, H.H. Milman, D.H. Müller, Salomon Munk, F.W. Newman, E. Renan, A.H. Sayce, George Smith, Bernhard Stade.

Beginning with the Biblical history of Abraham and the early Israelites, Moses, the Judges, Samuel, Saul, David, Nehemiah, it moves on to the Maccabean Revolt, early Christianity, and ends with the Fall of Jerusalem.

Part V: The History of Phoenicia is based chiefly upon the following authorities: A.H.L. Heeren, John Kenrick, T. Mommsen, F.C. Movers, .

Starting with the origins of the people of Phoenicia, this section documents their rise to maritime supremacy under Hiram I and his successors, Phoenicia under the Persians and Greeks the history of Carthage and its decline with the Punic Wars.

Part VI: The History of Western Asia is stated in the front matter as being based chiefly upon the following authorities: Ernest Babelon, Max Duncker, Paul Karolides, Eduard Meyer, Perrot & Chipiez, Georges Radet, A.H. Sayce, Albert Socin, Charles W. Super.

Quickly detailing the story of the Hittites, it moves on to the Scythians, and Cimmerians, the Lydians and a handful of other peoples of the Ancient Near East.

Part VII: The History of Ancient India gives in its front matter the following authorities from which it is chiefly derived: Arrian, Gustave Le Bon, Eugene Bournouf, Mountstuart Elphinstone, A.H.L. Heeren, W.W. Hunter, Sir William Jones, Ferdinand Justi, Saloman Lefmann, James Mill, Vedas, H.H. Wilson.

In three chapters, a brief overview of the early Hindus, the Vedas, the Brahmins, up to a description of the rise of Buddhism.

Part VIII: The History of Ancient Persia is based chiefly upon the following authorities: Ctesias, A.H.L. Heeren, Herodotus, G.C.C. Maspero, Eduard Meyer, Theodor Nöldeke, H.C. Rawlinson.Beginning with the Achaemenids, this part describes briefly the Medes, Elamites, leading up to the civilization of Persia under Cyrus and Darius I, Xerxes I and Artaxerxes III along with the fall of the empire.

Volume III: Greece to the Peloponnesian war 
Google Books link to Volume III

Volume IV: Greece to the Roman conquest 
Google Books link to Volume IV

Volume V: The Roman Republic 
Google Books link to Volume V

The cover matter states Part X: The History of Rome from the Earliest Times to 476 AD is based chiefly on the works of the following authorities: Ammianus, Appian, Thomas Arnold, Barthélemy Aube, the Augustan History, Julius Caesar, Henry Fynes Clinton, Cicero, Dion Cassius, Dionysius of Halicarnassus, Eutropius (historian), Florus, Victor Gardthausen, Edward Gibbon, Otto Gilbert, Adolf Harnack, G.F. Hertzberg, Herodian, Otto Hirschfeld, Thomas Hodgkin, Karl Hoeck, Wilhelm Ihne, Jordanes, Josephus, George Cornewall Lewis, H.G. Liddell, Livy, Joachim Marquardt, Charles Merivale, Eduard Meyer, Theodor Mommsen, Monumentum Ancyranaum, Cornelius Nepos, B. G. Niebuhr, Pliny the Elder, Pliny the Younger, Plutarch, Polybius, L. von Ranke, Sallust, Wilhelm Soltau, Strabo, Suetonius, Tacitus, Tillemont, Velleius, Georg Weber, Zosimus.

Many other authors are cited in addition to these, though their influence is felt to a lesser extent throughout the work.

Beginning with the early legends of the Founding of Rome and of the Roman Kingdom, it quickly proceeds to the Roman Republic, its development and rise to supremacy via its wars (Punic Wars, Samnite Wars, Macedonian Wars, the Roman conquest of Italy) and moves on to the final days of the Republic, the reforms of Tiberius and Gaius Gracchus, as well as those of Gaius Marius and his conflict with Sulla following the Jugurthine War in Africa on to the rise of Pompey and his war against Julius Caesar, the Catiline conspiracy, and ultimately the Crisis of the Roman Republic and its fall.

Volume VI: The early Roman empire 
Google Books link to Volume VI

Continuing Part X directly from the preceding volume, this volume begins with Augustus and goes up to the Fall of the Western Roman Empire in 476. It discusses the rise of Christianity, the many emperors who held power in Rome during the founding and the fall of the Roman Empire, the division of the Roman Empire and the many barbarian invasions (Huns, Goths, Vandals) leading up to Rome's fall.

Volume VII: The later Roman Empire 
Google Books link to Volume VII

Part XI: The History of the Later Roman Empire states that, along with over 75 additional authors, the work is based chiefly upon the following authorities: Agathias, Appian, Augustan History, J. B. Bury, Henry Fynes Clinton, George Kedrenos, Anna Komnene, Cassius Dio, Doukas (historian), Einhard, Eutropius (historian), George Finlay, Heinrich Gelzer, Edward Gibbon, Wilhelm von Giesebrecht, Ferdinand Gregorovius, Gustav Hertzberg, Thomas Hodgkin (historian), Jordanes, John Malalas, Procopius, Leopold von Ranke, Strabo, Tacitus, Marcus Velleius Paterculus, Georg Weber, Joannes Zonaras, and Zosimus.

Beginning with the reign of Arcadius in 395, Book I: The Later Roman Empire in the East deals with the Eastern Roman Empire through to the Fall of Constantinople in 1453, detailing as well the Siege of Constantinople (1204) by the members of the Fourth Crusade which led to the short-lived Latin Empire along with the various incidents in the history of Constantinople with several chapters dedicated to Justinian I; Book II The Later Roman Empire in the West begins with Odoacer and the Visigoth invasion of Italy followed by the Lombard invasion of Italy, the Carolingian dynasty and Charlemagne and the birth of the Holy Roman Empire up to the Investiture controversy and Henry V, Holy Roman Emperor.

Volume VIII: Parthians, Sassanids, and Arabs, the Crusades and the Papacy 
Google Books link to Volume VIII
Part XII: The History of the Parthians, Sassanids, and Arabs is based upon the following authorities: Abd al-Latif al-Baghdadi, Bar Hebraeus (Abul-Faraj), Abu'l-Fida, Maximilian Wolfgang Duncker, Ignác Goldziher, Alfred von Gutschmid, William Muir, Theodor Nöldeke, Louis-Pierre-Eugène Sédillot, Louis Viardot, Julius Wellhausen, Gustav Weil.

This section begins with the Parthian Empire, the conquests of Mithridates I of Parthia, and the Mithridatic Wars with Mithridates VI of Pontus; the next chapter deals with the Sasanian Empire and the continuation of the Roman–Persian Wars, the Hephthalite–Persian Wars; the history of Pre-Islamic Arabia is discussed, followed by an account of Muhammad the Spread of Islam; the Umayyad Caliphate, the Abbasid Caliphate, and the medieval history of Islam in Spain; finally, this section concludes with an account of Islamic jurisprudence.

Part XIII: The History of the Crusades and of the Papacy is based upon the following authorities: Abu'l-Fida, Choiseul, d'Aillencourt, Baha ad-Din ibn Shaddad, James Bryce, William Denton, John William Draper, Einhard, Edward Gibbon, Johann Karl Ludwig Gieseler, Henry Hallam, Henry Charles Lea, Joseph François Michaud, Charles Mills (historian), Henry Hart Milman, Johann Lorenz von Mosheim, Leopold von Ranke, Oswald Joseph Reichel , and Geoffrey of Villehardouin.

This section is divided into two books: the first deals with the Crusades, while the second deals with the History of the papacy.

Volume IX: Italy 
Google Books link to Volume IX

The front matter states that this volume is chiefly based upon the following authors: Francesco Bertolini, J. Burckhardt, Pierre Antoine Daru, S. Astley Dunham, Francesco Guicciardini, W. C. Hazlitt, Heinrich Leo, Machiavelli, F. A. Mignet, H. E. Napier, Lorenzo Pignotti, A. von Reumont, William Roscoe, J.C.L.S. Sismondi, J.A. Symonds.

Various other authors are given, from the 16th-century Italian historian Ammirato and the 12th-century Byzantine princess Anna Komnene to the renowned French Enlightenment writer Voltaire and over 70 others.

Volume X: Spain and Portugal 
Google Books link to Volume X
Part XV: The History of Spain and Portugal is based chiefly upon the following authorities:

Lopez de Ayala, Bakhuyzen van den Brink, H. Baumgarten, F. de Fonseca Benavides, G. Bergenroth, Andres Bernaldez, Ulick R. Burke, E. Castelar, Nuñez de Castro, Pinheiro Chagas, J.A. Conde, W. Coxe, R. Dozy, Samuel Astley Dunham, Florez Y Lafuente, V. de la Fuente, L.P. Gachard, Domião de Goez, A. Herculano, A. de Herrerra, N. Rosseeuw St. Hilaire, M.A.S. Hume, H.C. Lea, Diogo de Lemos, Juan de Llorente, R.H. Major, Juan de Mariana, W.F.P. Napier, João P. Oliveira-Martins, J. Ortiz y Sanz, W.H. Prescott, P. de Sandoval, M. Suriano, A. de Vertot, Geronimo Zurita.

Book I begins briefly with Spain's earliest known history under the Celts, the Phoenicians, and the Ancient Greeks through to the Roman conquest of Hispania, and the Gothic invasion; it quickly moves on to the Muslim conquest of Spain to the overthrow of the Muslims; it discusses the Kingdom of Aragon and of Castile before going in some greater detail regarding the reigns of Ferdinand II of Aragon and Isabella I of Castile, and of the monarchs of Habsburg Spain; this is followed by the House of Bourbon, Spain during the French Revolution, and the Peninsular War and ends in 1902 with the regency of Maria Christina of Austria.

Book II details the history of Portugal beginning with Afonso I of Portugal, the first king of Portugal, along with other kings including Afonso II of Portugal, Denis, and John I of Portugal before moving on to the role played by Portugal in the Age of Discovery, the Portuguese in India with the Portuguese conquest of Goa, and discusses the decline of Portugal as a major European power, the 1755 Lisbon earthquake, Brazil, Napoleon's Invasion of Portugal, and finishes off with the reign of Carlos I of Portugal.

Finally, a 36-page appendix is given on the Inquisition, the Cathari, the Waldensians and the Albigensian Crusade, the Jews in Spain, the Auto-da-fé and Tomás de Torquemada, the Grand Inquisitor of Spain.

Volume XI: France, 843–1715 
Google Books link to Volume XI

Part XVI: The History of France is based chiefly upon the following authorities:

A. Alison, Alexis Belloc, L.P.E. Bignon, Louis Blanc, Jules Caillet, J.B.R. Capefigue, Thomas Carlyle, François-René de Chateaubriand, Adolphe Chéruel, John Wilson Croker, E.E. Crowe, C. Dareste de la Chavanne, Brugière de Barante, A. Granier de Cassagnac, Philip de Commines, Jurien de la Gravière, Alexis de Tocqueville, Jehan de Vaurin, Victor Duruy, Gabriel-Henri Gaillard, François Guizot, C.P.M. Haas, Ernest Hamel, Ludwig Häusser, Karl Hillebrand, G.W. Kitchin, Lacretelle, A. Lamartine, Jules Michelet, F.A. Mignet, Enguerrand de Monstrelet, C. Pelletan, Victor Pierre, Jules Quicherat, Alfred Nicolas Rambaud, J.E. Robinet, Duc de Saint-Simon, J.R. Seeley, C. Seignobos, J.C.S. de Sismondi, Albert Sorel, H.M. Stephens, Heinrich von Sybel, H. Taine, M. Ternaux, A. Thiers, Voltaire.

Additional citations are given from over 70 additional authorities, including the likes of Walter Scott, Symphorien Champier, Guillaume de Nangis, Hippolyte Castille and Edmond Henri Adolphe Schérer.

This volume begins with the later Carolingians and documents the foundation of the House of Capet, the rise of the House of Valois, the Hundred Years' War, Cardinals Mazarin and Richelieu, and discusses the House of Bourbon to the death of Louis XIV of France in 1715.

Volume XII: France, 1715–1815 
Google Books link to Volume XII
Beginning with the early years of Louis XV of France, it moves on to Madame de Pompadour, Voltaire, Louis XVI and Marie Antoinette leading up to the French Revolution under Honoré Gabriel Riqueti, comte de Mirabeau, the Execution of Louis XVI and the Girondins, the Reign of Terror, the rise of Napoleon and his wars, the Treaties of Tilsit in 1807 down to the end of Napoleon with the Battle of Waterloo.

Volume XIII: France, 1815–1904; Netherlands 
Google Books link to Volume XIII

Volume XIV: The Netherlands (concluded), the Germanic empires 
Google Books link to Volume XIV
Continuing with the lowland nations from the previous volume, the first section of Volume XIV discusses Netherlands from 1722: William IV, Prince of Orange, the Treaty of Aix-la-Chapelle, the Fourth Anglo-Dutch War and the impact of the French Revolution on the Netherlands, followed by its absorption into the French Empire; the ministry of Johan Rudolph Thorbecke is discussed, and the history of the Netherlands concludes with Wilhelmina of the Netherlands. The history of Belgium is also touched upon in two chapters: its role during the War of the Austrian Succession, the Brabant Revolution and the Belgian Revolution, and ending with the reigns of Leopold I of Belgium and Leopold II of Belgium.

Part XVIII: The History of the Germanic Empires states that the work was based chiefly upon the following authorities: Aeneas Silvius, Alfred von Arneth, A. Beer, Karl Biedermann, Hans Blum, Thomas Carlyle, Chronicles of Colmar, Robert Buckley Comyn, William Coxe, Mandell Creighton, Hans Delbrück, Eduard Duller, Karl Fischer, H.T. Flathe, Frederick II, Bruno Gebhardt, Johann Karl Ludwig Gieseler, Anton Gindely, Karl Rudolf Hagenbach, James Wycliffe Headlam, Otto Kämmel, Friedrich Kohlrausch, Reinhold Koser, Franz Krones, Karl Lamprecht, János Majláth, H. Marnali, Wolfgang Menzel, D. Müller, Wilhelm Oncken, William Pierson, J.D.E. Preuss, Hans Prutz, Leopold von Ranke, Heinrich von Sybel, Heinrich von Treitschke, Georg Waitz, Adam Wolf.

Book I: The Holy Roman Empire begins with the Hohenstaufens, detailing the Emperors Lothair II, Conrad III and his Crusade, Frederick Barbarossa and his conflicts with the Pope, the Peace of Constance, and his Crusade; moving on to the decline of this royal family, the book describes the reign of Frederick II, Holy Roman Emperor who peacefully acquired Jerusalem during the Sixth Crusade. Moving on to the House of Habsburg, it discusses Rudolf I of Germany who came to power in 1273, beginning that dynasty's power throughout Europe for centuries; Charles IV, Sigismund, and the rise of the Hanseatic League, the Swabian League, and the Hussites. Moving on to Frederick III, Maximilian I and the Diet of Worms, and to Martin Luther and the Protestant Reformation; the Schmalkaldic War, the Protestant Union, the Thirty Years' War, the Grand Alliance, the Treaty of Ryswick, the Treaty of Passarowitz, and the Treaty of Versailles; a brief treatment of the Seven Years' War is given, the reign of Maria Theresa, and the decline of the Holy Roman Empire: the Treaty of Reichenbach, Leopold II, the Congress of Rastatt, to the abdication of Francis II, Holy Roman Emperor.

Book II: The Empire of Austria-Hungary picked up in the year 1806 with the Napoleonic Wars, Klemens von Metternich, the Treaty of Paris, the suppression of the Prague Revolution in 1848, the Hungarian Revolution of 1848 and Hungary's declaration of independence in 1849, and ends with the Battle of Novara.

Volume XV: Germanic empires (concluded) 
Google Books link to Volume XV

Austria-Hungary (concluded)

The History of Modern Germany

Volume XVI: Scandinavia, Switzerland to 1715 
Google Books link to Volume XVI
Part XIX: The History of Scandinavia states that it is based chiefly upon the following authorities: Adam of Bremen, A. Ahnfeldt, C.F. Allen, Georg Binder, Karl Blasendorff, Gustav Peter Blom, H.S. Bræksted (in Encyclopædia Britannica), Jean-Pierre Guillaume Cateau-Calleville, Olaf Celsius (1716–1794), Andrew Crichton, Olof von Dalin, O.H. Dumrath, Samuel Astley Dunham, Anders Fryxell, C.C.A. Gosch (in Encyclopædia Britannica), Erik Gustaf Geijer, Georg Friedrich von Jenssen-Tusch, Samuel Laing, Sven Lagerbrin, K. Lundblad, Paul Henri Mallet, O. Montelius, Friedrich Münter, W. Oncken, K.P.P. Paludan-Müller, Olaus Petri, Erik Pontoppidan, Kurt von Schlözer, Paul Christian Sinding, Snorri Sturluson, H. von Treitschke, Henry Wheaton.

Part XX: The History of Switzerland is derived chiefly from the following authorities: W. A. B. Coolidge, A. Daguet, Karl Dändliker, Johannes Dierauer, Johann Karl Ludwig Gieseler, Maguenot, G. O. Montelius, Johannes von Müller, Wilhelm Oechsli, R. von Radegg, Élisée Reclus, Johannes Strickler, A. Vieusseux, Johannes Vitoduranus, Louis Vulliemin, J. Wilson.

Volume XVII: Switzerland (concluded), Russia and Poland 
Google Books link to Volume XVII

Volume XVIII: England to 1485 
Google Books link to Volume XVIII

Volume XIX England, 1485–1642 
Google Books link to Volume XIX

Volume XX: England, 1642–1791 
Google Books link to Volume XX

Volume XXI: Scotland, Ireland, England since 1792 
Google Books link to Volume XXI

Volume XXII: The British colonies, the United States (early colonial period) 
Google Books link to Volume XXII

Volume XXII supplement: Australia and New Zealand 
Published 1908, and containing two additional chapters on Australia and four on New Zealand.

Volume XXIII: The United States (concluded), Spanish America 
Google Books link to Volume XXIII

Volume XXIV: Poland, the Balkans, Turkey, minor Eastern states, China, Japan 
Google Books link to Volume XXIV

Volume XXV: Index 
Google Books link to Volume XXV

Volume XXVI: These eventful years, part I. 
Google Books link to Volume XXV

Volume XXVII: These eventful years part II. 
Google Books link to Volume XXV

Reception 

The Spectator, writing on 25 January 1908 and prior to the release of the second half of the series, notes a handful of shortcomings including a fleeting portrayal of Homer and a questioning of the historicity of Christ, but states that "the general reader...will find here a great treasury of knowledge" and that "they form an extremely interesting shelfful."

References

External links

Worldcat library entry

1902 non-fiction books
20th-century history books
Encyclopedias of history
Encyclopædia Britannica
American encyclopedias
British encyclopedias
20th-century encyclopedias